Asia World Schools Debating Championship, commonly coined as AWSDC, is an international debate competition founded by the Debate Society of Anglo Singapore International School in 2013. The 1st Asia World Schools Debating Championship was held from 1–8 August 2013 at Anglo Singapore International School's Campus in Sukhumvit 64, Bangkok, Thailand including 7 preliminary rounds, and single elimination playoffs thereafter. The tournament was centred on the theme, "Youth Activism: It's Our Turn". 30 teams from all over the world participated; including Thailand, Taiwan, Singapore, Malaysia, China, Philippines, Korea, Sri Lanka, Bangladesh and South Africa. The team from Anglo Chinese Junior College (Singapore) emerged as the tournament's first champions, going undefeated in all of its 11 matches.

The 2nd AWSDC was held once again in Bangkok, Thailand from 31 July- 4 August 2014 at Anglo Singapore International School. It is the official pre-tournament of  World Schools Debating Championships (WSDC) Thailand 2014.

Tournament Format 
AWSDC adapts the World Schools Style debate format which is a combination of the British Parliamentary and Australia-Asian formats. All debates are carried out in English only. Each team consists of 3-5 debaters who each make 8 minute speeches either as side proposition or side opposition for or against a motion respectively. AWSDC emphasises high quality debates and adjudicating in order to provide a platform for young student debaters to improve and achieve their full potential. We also encourage friendly competition where student debaters not only gain academic knowledge but also build friendships with people of diverse backgrounds.

Adjudication Core

Tournaments

Winners

References

External links 
 1st AWSDC (2013) Official Website
 2nd AWSDC (2014) Official Website
 3rd AWSDC (2016) Official Website
 4th AWSDC (2017) Official Website

Debating
Schools debating competitions
Asian debating competitions